Phosocephala is a genus of parasitic flies in the family Tachinidae. There are at least two described species in Phosocephala.

Species
These two species belong to the genus Phosocephala:
 Phosocephala alexanderi Fleming & Wood, 2016
 Phosocephala metallica Townsend, 1908

References

Further reading

 
 
 
 

Tachinidae
Articles created by Qbugbot